Central Queensland University (alternatively known as CQUniversity) is an Australian public university based in central Queensland. CQUniversity is the only Australian university with a campus presence in every mainland state. Its main campus is at Norman Gardens in Rockhampton, however, it also has campuses in Adelaide (Wayville), Brisbane, Bundaberg (Branyan), Cairns, Emerald, Gladstone (South Gladstone and Callemondah), Mackay (central business district and Ooralea), Melbourne, Noosa, Perth, Rockhampton City, Sydney and Townsville. CQUniversity also has delivery sites to support distance education in Biloela, Broome, Busselton, Charters Towers, Karratha and Yeppoon, and partners with university centres in Cooma, Geraldton and Port Pirie.

History 
CQUniversity began as the Queensland Institute of Technology (Capricornia) in 1967, and after two years under the name of the University College of Central Queensland, in 1992 became an official university named the University of Central Queensland. In 1994, it adopted the name Central Queensland University. In 2008, it became CQUniversity in recognition of the institutions' expansion beyond the Central Queensland region.

Beginnings

CQUniversity's antecedent institution, the Queensland Institute of Technology (Capricornia), was established in Rockhampton in 1967 as a regional branch of the Queensland Institute of Technology (Brisbane).

However, the first steps to establish a university in Rockhampton were taken as early as the 1940s.  In 1941, the Queensland Labor Premier, William Forgan Smith, introduced section 17 of the National Education Co-ordination and University of Queensland Amendment Act, which provided for the creation of university colleges outside Brisbane. In 1944 and 1945, a series of Rockhampton delegations lobbied the Queensland government for a university college, but after the University of Queensland established a network of provincial study centres in the late 1940s the issue became dormant.

Rockhampton's university campaign resumed in the 1950s as Central Queensland became an emerging heavy industry base, with developing coal mines and Gladstone emerging as a light metals centre. In the Queensland parliament in November 1956, the local member for Rockhampton (H R Gardner) stated "more adequate facilities for technical education" were required for the region and, appealing to the philosophy of a "fair go", he urged that Rockhampton people be given "the same opportunities as those in Brisbane". In 1958, P J Goldston, an engineer (later, Commissioner for Railways,) mooted the possibility of a Central Queensland university with Rockhampton engineers and after further community discussion, the Rockhampton Mayor, Alderman R B J Pilbeam, called the first public meeting on 3 March 1959 at which the Central Queensland University Development Association (UDA) was constituted.

The UDA presented university proposals to government and, in 1961, the Queensland government reserved 161 hectares (400 acres) of government land at Parkhurst (North Rockhampton) on the Bruce Highway near the Yeppoon turnoff as a tertiary education site. Establishment finally was resolved in March 1965, when the Commonwealth government's Martin Report (on expansion of tertiary education) was tabled in parliament by Prime Minister Menzies―who announced the foundation of a new style of tertiary institution at both Rockhampton and Toowoomba. The new institutes―Rockhampton's was named The Queensland Institute of Technology, Capricornia (QITC)―were affiliated with the main Queensland Institute of Technology campus in Brisbane and lacked the autonomy of universities, being controlled by the Queensland Education Department.

When the QITC first opened in February 1967, there was no extensive campus to greet the handful of staff and initial intake of 71 full-time and part-time students. While building progressed at Parkhurst, the first classes held on the top floor of the Technical College in Bolsover Street were a makeshift affair with no laboratories, library facilities or stock. By 1969, most staff and students had transferred to the Parkhurst campus, still a bushland site in progress―in the summer months, the campus was often ringed by spectacular bush fires or deluged with torrential rain: cars slid in the mud or were bogged and the QITC's foundation Principal, Dr Allan Skertchly, ferried people in his 4WD across floodwaters. Some students slept temporarily on mattresses in the canteen while waiting for the first residential college to open.

1970s onwards
After the passage of the amended Education Act in 1971, QITC became an autonomous, multi-functional college under the control of its own council and took the name of Capricornia Institute of Advanced Education (CIAE).

Along with creating a traditional university campus experience in a natural setting, the CIAE also developed engineering and science projects. The CIAE became the first college in Australia to introduce a Bachelor of Science externally in 1974.

By 1979, external enrolments at the CIAE had increased to 825 and by 1985 distance education had become a major campus operation, exceeding internal enrolments and offering 12 courses involving some 100 subjects and processing 23,980 study packages annually.

Between 1978 and 1989, the CIAE established branch campuses in Central Queensland at Gladstone, Mackay, Bundaberg and Emerald.

Expansion in the 1990s

The CIAE became the University College of Central Queensland in 1990 and gained full university status in 1992.  At that time it was known as the University of Central Queensland. The name was changed in 1994 to Central Queensland University.

After the Australian government approved the enrolment of full-fee paying students in Australian institutions in 1986, the CIAE (and subsequently the university) began trans national education ventures with many countries, including Singapore, Hong Kong, Dubai and Fiji.  Through a public-private partnership with CMS (which CQU fully acquired in 2011) the university opened its first international campus in Sydney in 1994, followed by international campuses in Melbourne in 1997, Brisbane in 1998 and the Gold Coast in 2001.

2000 onwards

In 2001, the university appointed Queensland's first female Vice-Chancellor, Professor Glenice Hancock, who retired in 2004.

From 2009 onward, CQUniversity launched a new strategic plan to grow student numbers and expand course offerings, especially within the health disciplines. New course offerings included physiotherapy, podiatry, occupational therapy, speech pathology, oral health sonography, and medical imaging. CQUniversity also delivers courses in discipline areas including apprenticeships, trades and training, business, accounting and law, creative, performing and visual arts, education and humanities, engineering and built environment, health, information technology and digital media, psychology, social work and community services, science and environment, and work and study preparation.

In 2014, CQUniversity merged with CQ TAFE to establish Queensland's first dual sector university. CQUniversity is now the public provider of TAFE in the central Queensland region and also delivers vocational courses at other locations across Australia and online. Following the merger CQUniversity now delivers more than 300 courses from short courses through to PhDs.

CQUniversity is the only Australian university to be accredited as a Changemaker Campus by global social innovation group Ashoka U.

Medicine 
In March 2018 the university announced it was in talks to establish a medical school at its Rockhampton and Bundaberg campuses. Discussions are with the Hospital and Health Services of Central Queensland and Wide Bay, the main physical organisation of Queensland Health in the two regions.

Organisation and governance

Governance 
CQUniversity is governed by the CQUniversity Council, comprising the Chancellor, Vice-Chancellor and various elected and appointed representatives. Operationally, CQUniversity is managed by the Vice-Chancellor and five Deputy Vice-Chancellors who oversee portfolios including: International and Services, Research, Tertiary Education, Student Experience and Governance, Engagement and Campuses, Strategic Development and Finance and Planning. The Vice-Chancellor is appointed by the University Council and reports to the Council through the Chancellor.

Associate Vice-Presidents manage the regions in which the university operates including Rockhampton, Mackay and Whitsunday, Wide Bay Burnett, Gladstone, Central Highlands, South East Queensland, Townsville and North West Queensland, Far North Queensland, Victoria, New South Wales, South Australia and Western Australia.  Pro Vice-Chancellors manage the areas of learning and teaching, Indigenous engagement and vocational education. The Schools within the university are managed by Deans, within the Tertiary Education Division.

Vice-Chancellor 
CQUniversity is led by Professor Nick Klomp who was appointed as Vice-Chancellor and President in 2018. He officially commenced his appointment on Monday, 4 February 2019. Professor Klomp is the university's sixth Vice-Chancellor, replacing Professor Scott Bowman who served in the role from 2009 - 2019.

University Council
The CQUniversity Council is the governing body of CQUniversity and was established under the Central Queensland University Act (1998). Mr John Abbott is the Chancellor of CQUniversity.

Tertiary Education Division

The Tertiary Education Division is led by the university's Provost and overseas the delivery of higher education and vocational education through the university's schools.

Research

The Research Division is led by the Deputy Vice-Chancellor, Research who is responsible for shaping and implementing the university's research strategy.

International & Services Division
The Senior Deputy Vice-Chancellor (International & Services) is responsible for oversight and strategic management of the facilities and services which support the overall operations of the university. The Vice President and Senior Deputy Vice Chancellor is responsible, as part of the Senior Executive for overall strategic planning, commercial operations and leadership of the business operations for the university.

Within the University Services Portfolio lie the Directorates of Marketing, Facilities Management, People and Culture, Library Services, Information Technology, and Commercial Services.  The International Portfolio is responsible for management of the university's global operations including recruitment; delivery of programs; compliance; and government relations through embassies across the globe.

Student Experience and Governance Division
The Student Experience and Governance Division is led by the Deputy Vice-Chancellor (Student Experience & Governance) and is responsible for the management of governance processes within the university through the Council and sub-committees. The division is made up of three directorates including Governance, the Student Experience and Communications.

The Governance Directorate has day to day carriage of governance activities. The Internal Audit Directorate operates as an independent appraisal function which forms an integral part of the university's internal control framework. The Student Experience and Communications Directorate is responsible for promoting, supporting and enhancing the university's reputation, activities and achievements, through strategic communications.

Schools 
CQUniversity has six schools, each of which are managed by specialist Deans.

The schools are:
	School of Education and the Arts
	School of Business & Law
	School of Engineering & Technology
	School of Medical and Applied Sciences
	School of Human, Health and Social Sciences
	School of Nursing and Midwifery

Major areas of study 
CQUniversity runs programs in a wide range of disciplines, including apprenticeships, trades and training; business, accounting and law; creative, performing and visual arts; education and humanities; engineering and building environment; health; information technology and digital media; psychology, social work and community services, science and environment; and English (quality endorsed by NEAS Australia), work and study preparation.

Campuses 
CQUniversity has the following campuses: 
	CQUniversity Adelaide
	CQUniversity Brisbane
	CQUniversity Bundaberg
   CQUniversity Cairns
	CQUniversity Emerald
	CQUniversity Gladstone
	CQUniversity Mackay, City
	CQUniversity Mackay, Ooralea
	CQUniversity Melbourne
	CQUniversity Rockhampton, City
	CQUniversity Rockhampton, North
	CQUniversity Sydney
	CQUniversity Townsville
CQUniversity partners with a range of Regional University Centres at multiple sites across Australia providing infrastructure and academic support for students studying via distance with hominated partner universities.

Rockhampton campuses 

Two campuses operate in the Rockhampton region: Rockhampton, City (formerly CQ TAFE) and Rockhampton, North. The Rockhampton City campus is centrally located and offers a wide range of study options from certificates and diplomas to undergraduate programs. It also offers short courses in a range of areas including business, hospitality and beauty. Key facilities include Wilby's Training Restaurant, Hair Essence Hair Salon, Engineering Technology Centre, Trade training workshops and an Adult Learning Centre. The Rockhampton North campus is the university's headquarters. The campus has facilities including an Engineering Precinct, Health Clinic, Student Residence, food court and Sports Centre.

The Engineering Precinct has labs for fluids, thermodynamics, thermofluids, geotech, concrete and structures, and electronics. There is also a new lecture theatre, a postgraduate area, a materials-testing area, an acoustic test cell, a soils store, and a multi-purpose project-based learning lab.

The public-access health clinic on campus caters for up to 160 clients per day. The clinic allows students to work with qualified health professionals in the areas of oral health, occupational therapy, physiotherapy, podiatry and speech pathology.

Mackay campuses 

Two campuses operate in the Mackay region: CQUniversity Mackay, City (formerly CQ TAFE) and CQUniversity Mackay, Ooralea, including a Trades Training Centre. The Mackay City campus located on Sydney Street, in the Mackay CBD, delivers both vocational and academic courses. Facilities on the campus include 24-hour computer labs, training restaurants, hair dressing salon, beauty salon, canteen and library. The Mackay Ooralea campus is located on Mackay's southern outskirts and is about six kilometres from the city centre. The campus includes lecture theatres, a performance theatre, tutorial rooms, computer laboratories, a nursing laboratory, video-conference rooms, recording studios, student accommodation, a bookshop, a refectory and a library. On-site accommodation is provided at the Mackay Residential College.

The Trade Training Centre caters for 1500 students doing apprenticeship programs in electrical, plumbing, carpentry, furnishing, metal fabrication, mechanical fitting and light and heavy automotive training, as well as skills training for the building, construction, mines, minerals and energy sectors.

Bundaberg campus 

CQUniversity's Bundaberg campus is located on a 23-hectare site on Bundaberg's southern outskirts. The campus specialises in small class sizes and individually focused learning and teaching Campus facilities include a library, bookshop, campus refectory, a 200-seat and a 100‑seat lecture theatre, four computer laboratories, nursing clinical laboratories and videoconferencing rooms. In 2012, Bundaberg Regional Council and CQUniversity signed an accord as a formal expression of their commitment to have Bundaberg recognised as a 'University City'. The campus has an academic and research building which includes a 64-seat scientific laboratory, sound studio and multi-media and science research facilities. The campus also hosts a forensic crash lab to support learning for students enrolled in the Bachelor of Accident Forensics.

From 2013, CQUniversity Bundaberg has also offer commercial pilot training through a partnership with the Australian Flight Academy.

Gladstone campuses 
Two campuses operate in the Gladstone region: CQUniversity Gladstone, City (formerly CQ TAFE) and CQUniversity Gladstone, Marina. The Gladstone City campus is located in the CBD. It offers specialist training for the gas industry, instrumentation and business studies. Key facilities include a canteen, Engineering Technology Centre, computer labs, Adult Learning Centre, Hair Essence Hair Salon, beauty facilities and a sports oval. The Gladstone Marina campus is located within the Gladstone Marina precinct. It is home to the Gladstone Environmental Science Centre and the Gladstone Engineering Centre. Students at the campus use lecture theatre and training facilities, computer labs, the Cyril Golding Library, bookshop and a range of career counselling and support services.

Emerald campus 
CQUniversity Emerald (formerly CQ TAFE) is located on the Capricorn Highway, 275 km west of Rockhampton, and delivers trade based apprenticeships. Campus facilities include workshops for apprenticeship training, student common room and an afterhours computer lab.

Brisbane campus 
CQUniversity Brisbane is located in the heart of the CBD at 160 Ann Street, Brisbane. The campus comprises nine floors of facilities including lecture rooms, multimedia labs, bookshop, library and a student lounge.

Sydney campus 
CQUniversity Sydney is located on 400 Kent Street. With over 2000 international students, Sydney campus has the largest student population. The campus comprises lecture theatres, multimedia labs, bookshop, library, café and a student lounge. In 2013 the basement of the campus building was renovated and is now used as a dedicated space for students to relax and socialise.

Melbourne campus 
CQUniversity Melbourne is a city campus. the Campus comprises multimedia labs, CQUni Bookshop, library, student lounge, and presentation and audio-visual equipment.

Adelaide Campus 
CQUniversity Adelaide is located in the south-west of the city in close proximity to the Adelaide Showgrounds. The Campus is home to The Appleton Institute, a multidisciplinary research hub formerly Adelaide's Centre for Sleep Research. The Institute specialises in research, teaching and community engagement in a wide range of areas including safety science, sleep and fatigue, human factors and safety management, applied psychology, human-animal interaction and cultural anthropology.

Cairns campus 

The Cairns campus is located in the heart of the CBD and supports more than 2,200 on-campus and online students across the Far North region. Additional campus sites are located on the fringe of the CBD to provide state-of-the-art and contextual learning for CQU's aviation, sport sciences, paramedic science, and engineering courses. Facilities at the Cairns city campus range from nursing and engineering labs, creative and performing arts studios, film studios, digital media and production editing suites, computer labs, a library, learning and recreational spaces, and a multi-faith room. CQU Cairns is well positioned to parter with local industries with significant local research capability in built environment, renewable energies, automation and smart grid, artificial intelligence, internet of things, health and mental health, psychological science, education, sport and exercise science and digital media/arts technologies.

Other sites 

CQUniversity also operates distance education centres, hubs and sites in Charters Towers, Cooma, Cannonvale, Townsville, Perth, Karratha, Edithvale, and Geraldton.

Academic profile

Research centres & institutes 
CQUniversity has numerous research centres, institutes and groups including:
	Appleton Institute
	Collaborative Research Network – Health (CRN)
	Centre for Plant and Water Science
	Centre for Environmental Management
	Centre for Railway Engineering
	Centre for Intelligent and Networked Systems
	Process Engineering and Light Metals Centre (PELM)
	Centre for Research in Equity & Advancement of Teaching & Education (CREATE)
	Queensland Centre for Domestic and Family Violence Research (CDFVR)
	Centre for Physical Activity Studies (CPAS)
	Centre for Mental Health Nursing Innovation
	Centre for Longitudinal and Preventative Health Research
	Capricornia Centre for Mucosal Immunology
	Institute for Health and Social Science Research (IHSSR)
	Institute for Resources, Industry and Sustainability (IRIS)
	Power Engineering Research Group
	Business Research Group

The university is also a partner in the Queensland Centre for Social Science Innovation (QCSSI) together with the Queensland State Government, University of Queensland (UQ), Griffith University (GU), Queensland University of Technology (QUT) and James Cook University (JCU). The QCSSI is based at the St Lucia campus of UQ.

University art collection
The university began collecting art in the 1970s and has since developed a collection of almost 600 art works, including international and Australian paintings, ceramics, prints and photographs. While there is not a gallery or museum space at the university, art works are displayed across the campus network and lent to other organisations, such as regional galleries and other universities, for display in temporary exhibitions.

Rankings

CQUniversity graduates were ahead of the national rate for graduate full-time employment according to figures compiled by Graduate Careers Australia (GCA). GCA published a full-time report of 71.3%, while a direct comparison had the CQUniversity graduate full-time employment rate at 81.1%.
In 2013 CQUniversity was awarded five stars for online delivery, internationalisation and access in its first foray into the global university ratings QS Stars. It also scored a 4 for teaching and for facilities.

In 2012, CQUniversity lifted its rankings in the Excellence in Research for Australia (ERA) audit from 28 (in 2010) to 21. The university picked up three five-star ratings in 2012, up from its 2010 result of just two three-star ratings. CQUniversity performed at or well above world standard in four areas of research according to ERA 2012, with nursing research continuing to perform at 'world standard', and research in applied mathematics, agriculture and land management, and other medical and health sciences deemed to be ranked at the highest levels of performance 'well above world standard'.

Students 

As of 2014, CQUniversity had around 35,000 students enrolled across its various campuses as well as by distance education.

International students can study at CQUniversity campuses located at Brisbane, Adelaide, Melbourne and Sydney, or at CQUniversity's regional campuses in Bundaberg, Gladstone, Noosa, Mackay or Rockhampton.

Notable alumni 

Some of the notable alumni and past students of CQUniversity and its predecessor institutions include:
 Julian Assange, WikiLeaks founder
 Wayne Blair, Indigenous Australian filmmaker
 Martin Bowles, PSM, former Secretary of the Department of Health
 Tom Busby and Jeremy Marou of Australian rock duo Busby Marou
 Terry Effeney, chief executive officer of Energex
Craig Foster Former Socceroo Captain, prominent analyst, commentator, writer and advocate for human rights.
 Alexander Horneman-Wren SC
 Anna Meares, Olympic gold medal-winning track cyclist
 William McInnes, actor and author
 Peter Saide, Broadway performer
 Paul Ettore Tabone, opera and musical theatre performer (The Ten Tenors)
 Carolyn Hardy, International Board Member at Amnesty International
 David Battersby, Vice-Chancellor of Federation University
 Craig Zonca, breakfast presenter at ABC Radio Brisbane.
 Yohani, Sri Lankan singer, songwriter and rapper.

See also

List of universities in Australia
Education in Australia

References

External links 

Central Queensland University

 
Universities in Queensland
Educational institutions established in 1967
Rockhampton
Buildings and structures in Rockhampton
1967 establishments in Australia
Chiropractic schools in Australia
Schools in Queensland
Central Queensland